The Sunni Students' Federation (SSF) is an Islamic students' organisation in India.Originated in Kerala in 1973 under the patronage of Sheikh Abubakr Ahmad. It is affiliated to All India Sunni Jamiyyathul Ulama and Kerala Muslim Jamaath.

Sauhruda Kaalam 
SSF concluded a Campaign on 20 October 2016 targeting Salafis, Jamaat-e-Islami on Islamic State during the campaign public conferences in five major cities including Thiruvananthapuram, Ernakulam and selected cities of Malabar districts besides a state wide campaign named Sauhruda Kaalam.

SSF 40th Anniversary 
SSF celebrated its 40th anniversary in Kochi in the month of April 2013 with a three-day conference, which concluded at Jawaharlal Nehru International Stadium, in Kaloor. The Chief Minister of Kerala Oommen Chandy inaugurated the valedictory function and Sheikh Abubakr Ahmad delivered the keynote address. It was attended by thousands of students from both secular and religious institutions. SSF leaders said their activities are not meant to segregate the religious from the secular, but rather to help them complement and understand each other better.

Hind Safar - Bharat Yatra 
Hind Safar (also called SSF Bharat Yatra) is a nationwide expedition organised by the Sunni Students Federation to ensure education to all children and build a ‘friendly India’. The rally started from Hazratbal Shrine of Jammu and Kashmir on 12 January and ended at Kerala. The yatra covered 22 States over 16,000 kilometres and received 40 receptions.

SSF Sahithtolsav
Promotes and nurtures student art and literature. That programme starts from every families called family sahithyolsav. Later it is conducted in block level. Selected students only can participate in next stages which are Unit, Sector, Division, District, State. In 2022 the first edition of National sahithyolsav was held in Gujarat.

References

External links
 SSF Kerala
 SSF Karnataka

 
Sunni organizations
Sufi organizations
Youth movements
Islam in Kerala
Islamic organisations based in India
Sunni Islam in India
Member organizations of the Sunni Students Council
Muslim Jamaat